Albert Leopold Friedrich Christian Sylvester Anno Macarius, Prince of Saxony, Duke of Saxony, Margrave of Meissen (31 December 1893 – 9 August 1968) was the second son of Frederick Augustus III, the last reigning king of Saxony before the abolition of the monarchy in 1918. Upon his father's death in 1932, he became the head of the Royal House of Saxony. He was Captain à la suite in the Royal Bulgarian Infantry, and Grand Master of the Order of the Rue Crown, and also a Knight in the Order of the Black Eagle and Knight Grand Cross in the Sovereign Military Order of Malta.  As head of the House of Wettin after 1932, he styled himself as Friedrich Christian, Margrave of Meissen.

Life
He was born in Dresden, as the second son of King Frederick Augustus III of Saxony and his wife Archduchess Luise, Princess of Tuscany.

Friedrich Christian was made a lieutenant in the 1st Royal Saxon Leib-Grenadier Regiment No. 100 at the age of 10, in accordance a family tradition of the House of Wettin.  In 1913, he studied at the Military Academy in Dresden. During World War I, he served General Staff on the Western Front.  He received several medals for bravery.  He was very gifted linguistically and was sent on diplomatic missions to King Alfonso XIII of Spain, to Sultan Mehmed V of Turkey and to Emperor Charles I of Austria.

In 1918, Friedrich Christian was one of several candidates to the prospective Kingdom of Lithuania. On 13 November of that year, his father abdicated following the German Empire's defeat in the World War I. Friedrich Christian led the Saxon army home from Belgium and France to Germany, where they demobilized in Fulda.

After the end of World War I, he turned to the study of law at the universities of Cologne, Freiburg, Wrocław and Würzburg.   The subject of his PhD thesis was Nicholas of Cusa, who contributed significantly to the development of canon law in the late Middle Ages.  While studying in Breslau, he was a member of the Catholic student union
.  However, he resigned his membership in 1928 or 1929, because of substantive disagreement.

On 9 February 1920, he joined the KDSt.V. Thuringia Würzburg.  Here, he met Elisabeth Helene (1903-1976), a daughter of Albert, 8th Prince of Thurn and Taxis and his wife Archduchess Margarethe Klementine of Austria.  Elisabeth Helene was an honorary chairwoman of the Thuringian Lady Student Federation.  He married her on 16 June 1923 in Regensburg.

After completing his PhD, he became a private teacher of the history of art.  Around this time, his father asked him to take up the management of the family holdings in Saxony and Silesia.

In 1923, his older brother Crown Prince Georg renounced his succession rights and joined the Jesuit Order.  Friedrich Christian thus became heir apparent, and when his father died on 12 February 1932, he  succeeded as Head of the Royal House of Saxony

In 1937, the family moved to Wachwitz Castle in Dresden-Wachwitz, where they lived until 1945.  The castle survived the bombing raids in 1945, and Christian Friedrich took in many survivors.  Later that year, the family moved via Hof and Regensburg to Bregenz, where the two youngest children had been living since 1940.  Their close connections to the French, they were able, for instance, to arrange permission for Richard Strauss to move to Switzerland.

In 1955, their relatives in the Thurn und Taxis family helped them find a new home in the Harlaching borough of Munich. This study group became one of the largest historical societies in West Germany. Had he been King he would have been known as Friedrich Christian IV.

Friedrich Christian died on 9 August 1968 at Samedan.  He was buried outside the Royal Chapel in Königskapelle in Karrösten in North Tyrol.

Marriage and children
Friedrich Christian married on 16 June 1923, at Regensburg, Princess Elisabeth Helene of Thurn and Taxis (1903–1976), daughter of Albert, 8th Prince of Thurn and Taxis and his wife Archduchess Margarethe Klementine of Austria. They had five children:

Maria Emanuel, Margrave of Meissen (1926–2012), married in 1962 Princess Anastasia of Anhalt, without issue.
Princess Maria Josepha of Saxony (1928–2018), not married.
Princess Anna of Saxony (1929–2012), married in 1952 Roberto de Afif and had three sons.
Albert, Margrave of Meissen (1934–2012), married in 1980 Elmira Henke, without issue.
Princess Mathilde of Saxony (1936–2018), married in 1968 and divorced in 1993 Prince Johannes Heinrich of Saxe-Coburg and Gotha-Koháry, and had one (now deceased) son.

Ancestry

References
 Albert Herzog zu Sachsen: Die Wettiner in Lebensbildern, Styria-Verlag, Graz, Vienna and Cologne, 1995, 
 Bäsig, Frank-Michael: Friedrich Christian Markgraf von Meißen, Raute Verlag, Dresden, 1995,

External links 
 
 Biographical information
 Biography on the site of the House of Wettin

Footnotes 

Margraves of Meissen
1893 births
1968 deaths
House of Wettin
Saxon princes
Nobility from Dresden
German Roman Catholics
Albertine branch
Knights of the Golden Fleece of Austria
Sons of kings